Justine Vanhaevermaet  (born 29 April 1992) is a Belgian professional footballer who plays as a midfielder for Reading of the FA Women's Super League, and for the Belgium national team.

Career
On 17 August 2021, Reading announced the signing of Vanhaevermaet to a two-year contract.

Career statistics

International goals

Notes

References

External links
 
 
 

1992 births
Living people
Belgian women's footballers
Belgium women's international footballers
Women's association football midfielders
RSC Anderlecht (women) players
Super League Vrouwenvoetbal players
BeNe League players
Frauen-Bundesliga players
SC Sand players
Belgian expatriate women's footballers
Expatriate women's footballers in Germany
Belgian expatriate sportspeople in Germany
Expatriate women's footballers in Norway
Belgian expatriate sportspeople in Norway
WB Sinaai Girls players
Lierse SK (women) players
Røa IL players
LSK Kvinner FK players
UEFA Women's Euro 2022 players